"I Like Girls That Drink Beer" is a song recorded by American country music singer Toby Keith and co-written with Bobby Pinson. It was released in July 2012 and is the first single from his album Hope on the Rocks, released on October 30, 2012.

Content
Matt Bjorke of Roughstock.com states that the chorus of this uptempo break-up song, "feels distinctly country and what's good about it is that it's a song that's not really about beer. The hook "I like girls that drink beer" is more about finding a down to earth, regular woman instead of a high society, high-maintenance woman.” He goes on to say that, "Clearly contemporary, the song still has loads of fiddle, audible steel guitars and a downright country melody that makes it one of the most 'traditional' sounding songs to hit country radio."

Critical reception
Billy Dukes of Taste of Country rates the song 3.5 stars out of 5. He states, "the new song – presumably from an upcoming album — is closer to the 2003 hit ‘I Love This Bar’ than it is ‘Red Solo Cup’ or ‘Beers Ago.’ All of his best bar room cuts (including ‘Whiskey Girl’ and ‘As Good as I Once Was’) work because Keith sounds like he could easily fill in for Norm on ‘Cheers,’ albeit a more gruff and successful version of the famous television character."

Kevin John Coyne of Country Universe gave the song an A. Coyne states that this song is, "An awesome throwback that recalls the great class-crossed lovers anthems without borrowing too heavily from them." He goes on to say, "...Keith isn’t just one of the genre’s greatest singers and songwriters. He’s also one of its smartest. When he’s at his best, we get songs that celebrate the working man and the country boy without a whiff of condescension or pandering." He ends with saying, "This is Toby Keith at his best."

Music video
The music video was directed by Michael Salomon and premiered on September 7, 2012. It was filmed at a concert in San Bernardino, California.

Chart performance
"I Like Girls That Drink Beer" debuted at number 28 on the US Billboard Hot Country Songs chart for the week of August 11, 2012, Keith's second-best debut behind "Stays in Mexico", which debuted at number 27 in August 2004. It also debuted at number 86 on the Canadian Hot 100 chart and debuted at number 18 on the US Billboard Bubbling Under Hot 100 chart for the same week of August 11, 2012.

Year-end charts

References

2012 singles
2012 songs
Toby Keith songs
Show Dog-Universal Music singles
Songs written by Toby Keith
Songs written by Bobby Pinson
Music videos directed by Michael Salomon
Songs about alcohol